Haussegger is a German surname. Notable people with the surname include:

Nicholas Haussegger (1729–1786), American officer who defected to the British during the American Revolution
Virginia Haussegger (born 1964), Australian journalist

See also
Siegmund von Hausegger (1872–1948), Austrian composer and conductor

German-language surnames